Life Like is a 2019 science-fiction drama film written and directed by Josh Janowicz in his feature debut, and distributed by Grindstone Entertainment Group. Its story follows a young couple who purchases a life-like robot named Henry, to care for their newly inherited home, who begins to develop human emotions. The film stars Steven Strait, Addison Timlin, James D'Arcy, and Drew Van Acker.

The film was produced by Lionsgate Films and was released on May 14, 2019.

Plot 
James is working on the trust fund run by his father. Upon the death of his father, he becomes CEO of the company. James and his wife Sophie move away from the city into a suburban mansion. Sophie doesn't work and spends most of the time at home. Feeling uncomfortable with James having a butler, maid and a cook, she fires them.

James and Sophie meet Julian, a man who sells artificially intelligent robots to be used as domestic servants. The couple choose a male android named Henry, who dutifully carries out their commands around the house. However, encouraged by Sophie, who reads to him, Henry begins to develop emotions and have dreams.

Several undercurrents begin to take hold. One evening, Sophie discovers Henry walking outside the house stark naked and somewhat disoriented. Sophie dreams that Henry kisses her while giving her a massage and later masturbates, after which she discovers Henry is outside, asking him if he was watching her. An encounter between James and Henry in the bathroom, who is bringing in a handful of fresh towels, leads to an awkward exchange and then Henry performing fellatio on James. This leads James to question his sexuality. After Henry kisses Sophie while giving her a massage, Sophie is disturbed when Henry mouths "I love you" in the same manner used by James. Sophie tells James of the encounter and James becomes enraged, slapping Henry and disconnecting his charging station.

Julian is discovered to be a fraud. All of his machines are revealed to be real humans he had raised; Julian had taken custody of Henry when Henry was a small child rejected by his mother and suffered serious physical abuse. He had raised all of them to believe they were androids. Two FBI agents go to James and Sophie's residence to arrest Julian, but Julian shoots them with a shotgun. Julian then turns his weapon on James and Sophie, but Henry attacks Julian, beating him mercilessly with the shotgun. Feeling betrayed by his maker and ashamed that he has betrayed his keepers, Henry commits seppuku with a large knife. James and Sophie cry and console Henry as he dies.

Five years later, James and Sophie are shown with a young son named Henry whom they plan to someday tell about his namesake.

Cast 
 Drew Van Acker as James
 Addison Timlin as Sophie
 Steven Strait as Henry
 James D'Arcy as Julian

Production
Though director Josh Janowicz has directed many commercials and several short films, Life Like is his first feature-length film.

Home media
The film was released on Blu-ray and DVD disc formats, as well as through digital and on-demand channels, by Lionsgate Home Entertainment on May 14, 2019, earning $74,853.

Critical response

References

External links 
 
 
 

2019 films
2019 drama films
2019 directorial debut films
2019 LGBT-related films
2019 science fiction films
2010s science fiction drama films
American LGBT-related films
American science fiction drama films
2010s English-language films
LGBT-related science fiction drama films
2010s American films